No. 126 (Persian Gulf) Squadron RAF was a Royal Air Force Squadron formed to be a day bomber unit in World War I and reformed as a fighter unit in World War II.

History

Formation and First World War
No. 126 Squadron Royal Flying Corps was formed on 1 March 1918 and became a unit of the Royal Air Force a month later, but it disbanded on 17 August 1918.

Reformation in the Second World War
The squadron reformed in 1941 as a fighter unit equipped with Hawker Hurricanes and was stationed in Malta to provide air defence for the island. It was re-equipped with Supermarine Spitfires and then operated from Sicily and Italy. It moved to the UK in April 1944 and was disbanded on 10 March 1946 after a period equipped with the North American Mustang.

Aircraft operated

References

External links

 History of No.'s 126–130 Squadrons at RAF Web
 126 Squadron history on the official RAF website

126
126
Military units and formations established in 1918
1918 establishments in the United Kingdom